Maria Gustava Gyllenstierna (27 October 1672–5 November 1737) was a Swedish countess, writer and translator.

She was the daughter of count Christoffer Gyllenstierna and Gustava Juliana Oxenstierna and married in 1693 to count Karl Bonde of Björnö. After she became a widow in 1699, she lived on Tyresö Palace, which she had inherited from her grandmother Maria Sofia De la Gardie. She translated foreign works, wrote a work of the life of Jesus which was published in 1730-36, and wrote 600 sonnets. She gathered a circle of professors on Tyresö and corresponded with among others Sophia Elisabet Brenner. She was described as one of the most learned women of her epoch, and it was said that this made her unpopular among the male aristocracy, because she was generally to superior to them. 

During the Russian Pillage of 1719-1721, when the Russians where sacking the territory, she made saved Tyresö Palace from being burnt. She tore down the towers of the palace, which, upon a distance, gave the Russians the impression that the palace had already been sacked: therefore, they turned back, and the palace was saved. Her documentation of the sacking is a valuable document over the contemporary historical infrastructure of the area.

References
 Norrhem, Svante (2007). Kvinnor vid maktens sida : 1632-1772. Lund: Nordic Academic Press. Libris 10428618. 
 Skärgårdsöar och fiskekobbar, del 2, av Bertil Hedenstierna 1990,Rabén & Sjögren, 
 Nordiska museets och Skansens årsbok 1933, red. Andreas Lindblom, Gösta Berg, Sigfrid Svensson
 Rysshärjningarna i ornö socken 1719, av Britt-Marie Utter Wahlström 2002
 Rysshärjningarna på Ostkusten sommaren 1719, av Magnus Ullman 2006
 Svenska Adelns Ättartavlor, utgiven 1927 av Gustaf Elgenstierna
 https://web.archive.org/web/20170202002756/http://nordicwomensliterature.net/sv/article/grevinnan-p%C3%A5-tyres%C3%B6-slott#1.2.Sonetter_ver_Jesu_liv_lidande_och_dd

Further reading
 

1672 births
1737 deaths
Swedish translators
18th-century Swedish women writers
Swedish countesses
Swedish people of the Great Northern War
18th-century Swedish writers
18th-century women landowners
18th-century Swedish landowners